Walther von Klingen (died 1 March 1284) was a nobleman from the Thurgau area who donated to and founded monasteries, and later became a close associate and supporter of King of Germany Rudolf von Habsburg. Some of his poetry, which belongs to the Middle High German  tradition, has been preserved in the Codex Manesse manuscript.

Life
Walther came from an old Thurgau family. He was the son of Ulrich II von Altenklingen, the founder of Klingnau. His mother was Ita von Tägerfelden. The first document mentioning Walther (together with his parents and older brother) is from 1240. In 1249, he married Sophia von Frohburg. They had eight children, but all of their three sons died early. After his father's death , the family estate was split between Walther and his brother, which was finalised in a 1253 contract. Walther also gained ownership of some of his mother's inheritance. He appears in several documents as arbitrator of disputes or witness of important contracts. Walther was a close associate and supporter of King Rudolf von Habsburg. He died on 1 March 1284 in Basel.

Eight of Walther's songs were preserved in the Codex Manesse manuscript. In the corresponding miniature, Walther is shown as the victor of a joust, bearing the Altenklingen coat of arms. His poetry has been described as "not worthy of special praise" and he is considered only a "minor" poet. The known poems are conventional songs with themes of lamentations, courtship or praise, and show influences of Gottfried von Neifen and Konrad von Würzburg.

References

Sources

External links

Digital reproduction of the Codex Manesse, University of Heidelberg

1284 deaths
13th-century German poets
German male poets
Minnesingers